James Potter may refer to:

 James Potter (Pennsylvania politician) (1729–1789), soldier, farmer, and politician from Pennsylvania
 James Potter (baseball) (1864–1934), American businessman and owner of baseball club the Philadelphia Phillies
 James B. Potter Jr. (born 1931), Los Angeles, California, City Council member
 James C. Potter (1855–1925), American engineer, inventor, businessman and civic leader
 Jimmy Potter (born 1941), Northern Irish former footballer
 James Potter (character), Harry Potter series character
 James Sirius Potter, Harry Potter series character